Jake Young may refer to:
 Jake Young (American football)
 Jake Young (footballer)

See also
 Jacob Young (disambiguation)